is an underground metro station located in Tempaku-ku, Nagoya, Aichi Prefecture, Japan operated by the Nagoya Municipal Subway's Tsurumai Line. It is located 17.6 rail kilometers from the terminus of the Tsurumai Line at Kami-Otai Station.

History
Ueda Station was opened on 1 October 1978.

Lines

 (Station number: T17)

Layout
Ueda Station has two underground opposed side platforms. The platforms are as follows:

Platforms

Surroundings
Mitsubishi UFJ Bank Ueda Branch (三菱UFJ銀行植田支店)

References

External links

 Ueda Station official web site 

Railway stations in Japan opened in 1978
Railway stations in Aichi Prefecture